Acta Neuropathologica is a monthly peer-reviewed scientific journal covering all aspects of neuropathology published by Springer Science+Business Media. It was established in 1961 and the editor-in-chief is Johannes Attems (Newcastle University).

Abstracting and indexing 
The journal is abstracted and indexed in:

According to the Journal Citation Reports, the journal has a 2020 impact factor of 17.088.

References

External links 
 

Springer Science+Business Media academic journals
Publications established in 1961
Neurology journals